Begum Fazilatunnecha Mujib Government Mohila College is a government educational institution  in Fulbaria upazila of Mymensingh district, Bangladesh.

History 
The school was established on September 17, 1999 as a specialized educational institution for women's education by local member of parliament  Moslem Uddin.

The school was named after Bangamata Begum Fazilatunnesa Mujib.

In 2018, in an official announcement, the educational institution including 301 other educational institutions, was fully governmentised.

Awards 
The institute was recognized as the "Best Educational Institution" at the upazila level in the college department in the National Education Week-2019.

See more 
 National University, Bangladesh
 Shahabuddin Degree College

References

Colleges in Mymensingh District
Colleges affiliated to National University, Bangladesh
Universities and colleges in Mymensingh District
Educational institutions established in 1999
1999 establishments in Bangladesh
Women's universities and colleges in Bangladesh